Grenville-Dundas was an electoral riding in Ontario, Canada, that was represented in the Legislative Assembly of Ontario from 1934 to 1975.  It was created in 1934 from the ridings of Grenville and Dundas. In 1975, Grenville was redistributed into the riding of Carleton-Grenville, and Dundas was redistributed into the riding of Stormont-Dundas and Glengarry.

Members of Provincial Parliament

References 

Former provincial electoral districts of Ontario